Bethel Presbyterian Church is a historic Presbyterian church in Alcorn, Mississippi.

Location
The church is located in what is now known as Alcorn in Claiborne County, Mississippi. It is one mile North of the Antebellum Canemount Plantation and nearly three miles South of the former Windsor Plantation, now known as the Windsor Ruins.

History
The congregation was established in 1826. Its pastor was Jeremiah Chamberlain. The current building was built in the 1840s.

Heritage significance
It has been listed the National Register of Historic Places since 1978.

References

Presbyterian churches in Mississippi
Churches on the National Register of Historic Places in Mississippi
Greek Revival church buildings in Mississippi
Churches completed in 1828
19th-century Presbyterian church buildings in the United States
Churches in Claiborne County, Mississippi
1828 establishments in Mississippi
National Register of Historic Places in Claiborne County, Mississippi